Mana is a given name. People and fictional characters with the name include:

People 
 Mana (Japanese musician) (fl. from 1992)
 Mana of Bet-Parsaje, a Christian martyr in 339 AD
 Mana of Seleucia-Ctesiphon, an early bishop
 Mana Ashida (born 2004), Japanese actress and singer
 Mana Endo (born 1971), Japanese tennis player
 Mana Iwabuchi (born 1993), Japanese football player
 Mana Mamuwene (born 1947), Congolese football player
 Mana Neyestani (born 1973), Iranian cartoonist
 Mana Nishiura (1971–2005), Japanese drummer for Shonen Knife band
 Mana Sakura (born 1993), Japanese model
 Mana Shim (born 1991), American soccer player
 Mana Watanabe (born 1993), Japanese women's professional shogi player
 Mana Yoshinaga (born 1979), Japanese singer in Rin'

Fictional characters 
 Mana, a character in Mermaid Saga
 Mana Kirishima, a Neon Genesis Evangelion character
 Mana Kuzunoha, a character in Tenjho Tenge
 Mana Tatsumiya, a character in Mahou Sensei Negima
 Mana Walker, a character in D.Gray-man
 Mana Takamiya, a a character in Date A Live

Japanese feminine given names